The Social Reconciliation Reform and Development Party (TURK PARTİ) was a Turkish political party founded by Ahmet Eyüp Özgüç on 2010,  adopting the principles of a democratic state of law.

The TURK party announced that they would participate in the June 2015 general election. The party got 72,701 votes in the election.

2010 establishments in Turkey
Centrist parties in Turkey
Political parties established in 2010
Political parties disestablished in 2022
Political parties in Turkey